The 1910 Colorado Agricultural Aggies football team represented Colorado Agricultural College (now known as Colorado State University) in the Rocky Mountain Conference (RMC) during the 1910 college football season. In their first and only season under head coach George Cassidy, the Aggies compiled a 0–5 record, failed to score a point in the final five games of the season, and were outscored by a total of 110 to 6.

Schedule

References

Colorado Agricultural
Colorado State Rams football seasons
Colorado Agricultural Aggies football